Parappil Puthiyapurayil Ummer Koya (1 July 1922 – 1 September 2000) was an Indian politician, Gandhian, freedom fighter and educationist. He was the second Education Minister of Government of Kerala headed by Pattom Thanu Pillai. He also served as the Minister for Public Works in government headed by R. Sankar.

Political career
Born in Calicut, the young Ummer Koya entered public life as an activist of the Indian National Congress. He played a key role in building up the Congress Party in the Malabar region. He was appointed as the Malabar Youth Congress Convenor in 1952. Two years later, he was elected to the Madras Legislative Council. Ummer Koya contested 1960 elections as an Indian National Congress candidate from Manjeri constituency and was elected to the Kerala Legislative Assembly.

Koya held the portfolio of Education from February 1960 to September 1962, in the Ministry headed by Pattom Thanu Pillai. He also handled the Portfolio of Public Works, in the Ministry headed by R. Sankar from September 1962 to September 1964. During his political career, he also had served as the Vice President of Kerala Pradesh Congress Committee (KPCC). He had also a stint as a member of the Kerala Public Service Commission.

Along with K. Kelappan, M. P. Manmadhan, and M. K. Kumaran, Koya was actively involved in the campaign for prohibition.

P.P. Ummer Koya Award
An award titled P.P. Ummer Koya Award has been instituted by P.P. Ummer Koya Foundation, Kozhikode in honour of him. The prominent winners of the award include, Justice P. K. Shamsudheen (2007), freedom fighter K. E. Mammen (2008), and noted social activist and environmentalist A. Achyuthan (2009).

The Kerala Legislative Assembly paid its homage to him on 21 December 2000.

References

Malayali politicians
Politicians from Kozhikode
2000 deaths
20th-century Indian Muslims
Indian National Congress politicians from Kerala
1922 births
Kerala MLAs 1957–1959
Education Ministers of Kerala